The 2016–17 Delaware Fightin' Blue Hens women's basketball team represented the University of Delaware during the 2016–17 NCAA Division I women's basketball season. The Fightin' Blue Hens, led by 21st year head coach Tina Martin, played their home games at the Bob Carpenter Center and were members of the Colonial Athletic Association (CAA). They finished the season 16–14, 10–8 CAA play to finish in fourth place. They played in the quarterfinal of the CAA women's tournament where they lost to William & Mary.

Roster

Schedule

|-
!colspan=9 style="background:#00539f; color:#FFD200;"| Non-conference regular season

|-
!colspan=9 style="background:#00539f; color:#FFD200;"| CAA regular season

|-
!colspan=9 style="background:#00539f; color:#FFD200;"| CAA Women's Tournament

See also
2016–17 Delaware Fightin' Blue Hens men's basketball team

References

External links

Delaware Fightin' Blue Hens women's basketball seasons
Delaware
Delaware Fightin' Blue Hens women's basketball
Delaware Fightin' Blue Hens women's basketball